So You Think You Can Dance is an American television reality program and dance competition airing on the Fox network. The show's eighth season premiered on May 26, 2011. It features the return of Mary Murphy and Nigel Lythgoe as permanent judges and Cat Deeley as host. Also returning is the selection of a Top 20 for the finals, in contrast to season 7's Top 11. This is the final season to feature Results Show episodes. Contemporary dancer Melanie Moore won the season and Sasha Mallory was the runner-up. This is the first season where both the winner and runner-up were female.

Judging panel
Mary Murphy returned and replaced Mia Michaels as a permanent judge after being absent in season 7 due to contract disputes and to undergo surgery to remove a thyroid tumor. Adam Shankman's permanent judge spot—to which he was unable to return due to conflict with directing the film Rock of Ages—was filled with rotating guest judges Robin Antin, Lil' C, Tyce Diorio, Toni Redpath, and Jason Gilkison.

Auditions
Open auditions for this season took place in the following five cities:

Las Vegas week 
Judges: Nigel Lythgoe, Mary Murphy, Debbie Allen, Tyce Diorio, Robin Antin, and Adam Shankman, who was replaced by Jason Gilkison on Day 2 due to a conflict with his schedule.
The Las Vegas callbacks, which started on April 8, 2011, were held at Planet Hollywood Resort and Casino in Las Vegas, Nevada. Thirty-one dancers made it through to the final stage before the selection of the Top 20.

Finals

Format changes
This season featured a combination of the Top 20 format from seasons 2–6 and the All-Star format from season 7. The finals began with a Top 20. When the show reached Top 10 week, contestants from previous seasons (the All-Stars) partnered current contestants in individual dance genres. Lythgoe has noted that although fans of the show complained about season 7's format and missed "the interconnection between people who had never been in competition before," "putting [contestants] with an All-Star lifted their game immensely," which informed his decision to combine the two formats and try to "have the best of both worlds." This season also marked the first time that the public was able to cast their votes by SMS or online, in addition to calling in, with a limit of 50 votes per viewer.

Top 20 Contestants

Female contestants

Jordan turned 19 on June 15, 2011.

Male contestants

Robert was 30 at the time of application. His age on the website is 31 years old.

Elimination chart 

Contestants are listed alphabetically by first name, then in reverse chronological order of elimination.

 The judges elected not to eliminate anyone the first week. As a result, two couples were eliminated the following week.

 Due to Mitchell Kelly having an elbow injury, he was barred from performing the routine. See below for more information.

Performance shows

Meet the Top 20 (June 9, 2011)
 Judges: Nigel Lythgoe, Mary Murphy, Tyce Diorio, Lil' C, Robin Antin
 Performances:

Top 20 Perform (June 15, 2011)
 Judges: Nigel Lythgoe, Mary Murphy, Megan Mullally
 Performances:

 Due to a shoulder injury, Mitchell Kelly was barred from performing in his routine. He was replaced for the evening by season 7's Robert Roldan and was automatically in danger of going home.

Top 20 Perform Again (June 22, 2011)
 Judges: Nigel Lythgoe, Mary Murphy, Debbie Reynolds
 Performances:

Top 16 Perform (June 29, 2011)
 Judges: Nigel Lythgoe, Mary Murphy, Kristin Chenoweth, Lil' C
 Performances:

Top 14 Perform (July 6, 2011)
 Judges: Nigel Lythgoe, Mary Murphy, Carmen Electra, Travis Wall
 Performances:

Top 12 Perform (July 13, 2011)
 Judges: Nigel Lythgoe, Mary Murphy, Jesse Tyler Ferguson, Sonya Tayeh
 Performances:

Top 10 Perform (July 20, 2011)
 Judges: Nigel Lythgoe, Mary Murphy, Neil Patrick Harris
 Performances:

 Solos:

Top 8 Perform (July 27, 2011)
 Judges: Lady Gaga, Nigel Lythgoe, Mary Murphy, Rob Marshall
 Performances:

Top 6 Perform (August 3, 2011)
 Judges: Nigel Lythgoe, Mary Murphy, Lil' C, Christina Applegate
 Performances:

 Solos:

Top 4 Perform (August 10, 2011)
 Judges: Nigel Lythgoe, Mary Murphy, Katie Holmes, Kenny Ortega
 Performances:

 Solos:

Result shows

Results show musical performances

Week 1 (June 16, 2011)
 Group dance: Top 20: "XR2"—M.I.A. (Jazz; Choreographer: Sonya Tayeh)
 Guest dancers: (Gopak)
 Bottom 3's solos:

 Eliminated:
 No one was eliminated.
 New partners:
 None. Starting with the next four weeks, no one will get a new partner until Top 10.

Week 2 (June 23, 2011)
 Group dance: "Sinnerman"—Nina Simone (Hip-hop; Choreographer: Dave Scott)
 Guest dancers: Quest Crew
 Bottom 3's solos:

 NOTE:
 Four contestants were eliminated because no one was voted off in Week 1.

Week 3 (June 30, 2011)
 Group dance: "The Incredits" from The Incredibles (Jazz; Choreographer: Michael Rooney)
 Guest dancers:
 AXIS Dance Company ("Partita for Violin No. 2 in D Minor, BWV 1004: V. Ciaccona"—Janine Jansen; Contemporary; Choreographer: Alex Ketley)
 Eric Luna and Georgia Ambarian ("Calypso" from Pirates of the Caribbean: At World's End; Ballroom)
 Bottom 3's solos:

Week 4 (July 7, 2011)
 Group dance: "Kata Kata" from Raavan (Bollywood; Choreographer: Nakul Dev Mahajan)
 Guest dancers: Cedar Lake Contemporary Ballet ("Ends"—Mikael Karlsson)
 Bottom 3's solos:

Week 5 (July 14, 2011)
 Group dance: "El Fuego" by Sean Peter feat. Oscar Jimenez (Flamenco-Jazz; Choreographer: Kelley Abbey)
 Guest dancers: Jason Samuels Smith & Anybody Can Get It - "Move The Crowd (Sole Sessions Pt. 1)"
 Bottom 3's solos:

Note: Now it's up to Top 10, they'll be voted individually by America. Also, new partners randomly picked whether they get a male or female and an All-Star pool.

Week 6 (July 21, 2011)
 Group dance: "Act One: On Broadway" from Smokey Joe's Cafe (Broadway; Choreographer: Josh Bergasse)
 Guest dancers: Daniil Simkni from The American Ballet Theater ("Les Bourgeois"—Jacques Brel; Ballet)
 Bottom 4's solos:

Week 7 (July 28, 2011)
 Group dance: "The Circus Sets Up" from Water for Elephants (Contemporary; Choreographer: Tyce Diorio)
 Guest dancers: The Legion of Extraordinary Dancers ("Bernini's Angels"—Kerry Muzzey; Choreographers:Christopher Scott and Galen Hooks)
 Bottom 4's solos:

Week 8 (August 4, 2011)
 Group dance: "Grown Unknown"—Lia Ices (Contemporary; Choreographer: Justin Giles)
 Guest dancers:
Kent Boyd and Lauren Froderman: "Collide"—Howie Day (Contemporary; Choreographer: Travis Wall)
 Bad Boys of Dance: "Derezzed" from Tron: Legacy (Choreographer: Rasta Thomas)
 Top 6's solos:

Week 9 (Finale) (August 11, 2011)
Judges: Nigel Lythgoe, Mary Murphy, Jesse Tyler Ferguson, Sonya Tayeh, Tyce Diorio, Robin Antin, Lil' C
Group dances:

 Matt Flint is the winner of So You Think You Can Dance UKs second season, and this performance comprised a portion of his prize package.

Judges' picks

All-Stars Dance Pool
As opposed to last season, there is no set group of All-Star dancers. Rather, All-Stars will be changing weekly based on availability. On the July 14, 2011 results show, Lythgoe announced that Season 7 contestant Alex Wong—forced to withdraw after tearing an Achilles tendon—was asked to be an All-Star for Top 10 week, but that Wong tore his other Achilles tendon at an audition the Saturday prior and thus would not be able to participate.

 This dancer was eliminated this week.
 This dancer was in the bottom 4 this week.
 This All-Star did not perform this week.
 This dancer placed second in the competition.
 This dancer won the competition.
All-Stars in bold text' won the competition in their season.

Ratings

U.S. Nielsen ratings

See also
 List of So You Think You Can Dance finalists

Notes

References

2011 American television seasons
Season 08